Steven Garrett Lowney (born October 3, 1979 in Appleton, Wisconsin) is an American former Greco-Roman Olympic wrestler.

Lowney wrestled for the University of Minnesota under coach J Robinson. While at the University of Minnesota, he received his B.A. in Marketing at the Carlson School of Management, won a bronze medal at the 2000 Summer Olympics in Sydney, and ran a youth instruction company to support his way through college. After graduation, he became a member of the 2004 Summer Olympic team in Athens. He had attended Freedom High School which is in the small town of Freedom, Wisconsin.

References

External links
 Garrett Lowney's U.S. Olympic Team bio

1979 births
Living people
Sportspeople from Appleton, Wisconsin
Wrestlers at the 2000 Summer Olympics
Wrestlers at the 2004 Summer Olympics
American male sport wrestlers
Olympic bronze medalists for the United States in wrestling
Medalists at the 2000 Summer Olympics